The Cals cabinet was the executive branch of the Dutch Government from 14 April 1965 until 22 November 1966. The cabinet was formed by the christian-democratic Catholic People's Party (KVP) and Anti-Revolutionary Party (ARP) and the social-democratic Labour Party (PvdA) after the fall of the previous Cabinet Marijnen. The cabinet was a centrist coalition and had a substantial  majority in the House of Representatives; prominent Catholic politician Jo Cals, a former Minister of Education, served as Prime Minister. Labour Leader Anne Vondeling served as Deputy Prime Minister and Minister of Finance, Protestant Leader Barend Biesheuvel continued as Deputy Prime Minister, Minister of Agriculture and Fisheries and the responsibility for Suriname and Netherlands Antilles Affairs from previous cabinet.

The cabinet served in the middle of the tumultuous 1960s. Domestically it had to deal with the counterculture and implemented several major social reforms to social security, as well as closing the mines in Limburg and stimulating urban development in the Randstad. Internationally, the protests against the Vietnam War were a major point of attention. The cabinet suffered several major internal and external conflicts, including multiple cabinet resignations. The cabinet fell just 18 months into its term on 14 October 1966, following a major political crisis after Catholic Leader Norbert Schmelzer proposed a counter-motion that called for stronger austerity measures to reduce the deficit than those the cabinet had itself proposed. Prime Minister Cals saw this as an indirect motion of no confidence from his own party, and announced his resignation; the cabinet continued in a demissionary capacity until it was replaced by the caretaker Cabinet Zijlstra.

Formation
After the fall of the Marijnen cabinet, the confessional parties did not want snap elections because those could centre on the introduction of commercial television, the issue that led to the fall of the former cabinet. So a new cabinet was formed on the basis of the existing situation. A continuation of the Marijnen cabinet was considered to have too narrow a basis, so PvdA was asked to join in. As a result, CHU stepped out. But previous frictions between PvdA and KVP were overcome because there was a desire to form a cabinet fast, which was indeed done, in just over a month.

Term
After two decades of economic growth, this cabinet experienced a slight recession. Plans to build sports halls, roads and houses had to be tempered. In Limburg the coal mines were closed, and plans were devised to educate and re-employ the former miners.

There was also social unrest, which became apparent in the Provo movement, construction worker protests, riots over the marriage of Princess Beatrix in Amsterdam and the rise of new parties: the Farmers' Party (BP), the Pacifist Socialist Party (PSP), the Reformed Political League (GPV) and the Democrats 66 (D'66). The last party, especially, wished to change the political order..

On 14 October 1966 Norbert Schmelzer the Leader of the Catholic People's Party and Parliamentary leader of the Catholic People's Party in the House of Representatives proposed a Motion of no confidence against the cabinet and Prime Minister Jo Cals. A shocking and surprised action in Dutch politics, it marked the first time that a motion of no confidence was proposed against a cabinet of the same party. The cabinet resigned that evening.

Changes
On 5 February 1966 State Secretary for Defense for Air Force Affairs Jan Borghouts (KVP) died following a debilitating disease at the age of 55. On 22 June 1966 former Chairman of the United Defence Staff lieutenant general Heije Schaper, who until then had been working as Chief Adjutant in extraordinary service to Queen Juliana was installed as his successor.

On 31 August 1966 Minister of the Interior Jan Smallenbroek (ARP) resigned after he was involved in a traffic incident while driving under the influence. Minister of Justice Ivo Samkalden (PvdA) served as acting Minister of the Interior until 5 September 1966 when Koos Verdam (ARP), who until then had been working as a professor of Roman and International Private Law at the VU University Amsterdam was appointed as his successor.

Cabinet Members

Trivia
 Four cabinet members (later) served as Prime Minister: Jo Cals (1965–1966), Barend Biesheuvel (1971–1973), Joop den Uyl, (1973–1977) and Piet de Jong (1967–1971).

References

External links
Official

  Kabinet-Cals Parlement & Politiek
  Kabinet-Cals Rijksoverheid

Cabinets of the Netherlands
1965 establishments in the Netherlands
1966 disestablishments in the Netherlands
1966 in the Netherlands
Cabinets established in 1965
Cabinets disestablished in 1966